Khalil Sharif (Arabic: خليل شريف) (born 5 November 1984) is a Qatari footballer. He currently plays as a left back for Al Bidda .

External links
 

Qatari footballers
1984 births
Living people
Mesaimeer SC players
Al-Wakrah SC players
Al Ahli SC (Doha) players
Umm Salal SC players
Al Bidda SC players
Qatar Stars League players
Qatari Second Division players
Association football fullbacks